Abdel-Ilah Yusef Abed Al-Hanahneh (born in 1984) is a retired Jordanian footballer who is a right back for Al-Yarmouk. He is a member of the Jordan national football team.

Career
His first international match with the Jordan national team was against Uzbekistan in a friendly on August 13, 2012, in Amman. He was asked by the Jordan national team to take Khalil Bani Attiah's place as right back for Jordan in the 2014 FIFA World Cup qualifying match between Jordan and Australia on September 11, 2012, in Amman, since Bani Attiah was suspended from playing that match after receiving two bookings in the 2014 WC qualifications and Al-Hanahneh was one of the other best Jordanian right backs.

References

External links 
 
 
 

Living people
Jordan international footballers
Sportspeople from Amman
Al-Faisaly SC players
Shabab Al-Ordon Club players
1984 births
Jordanian footballers
Association football defenders
Al-Hussein SC (Irbid) players
Al-Ahli SC (Amman) players
Al-Yarmouk FC (Jordan) players
Jordanian Pro League players